The EuroHockey Club Trophy I is an annual men's field hockey competition organised by the EHF for European hockey clubs. It is the second most prestigious European club competition, being one tier below the top men's European club competition the Euro Hockey League. In that sense, the ECT is hockey's equivalent of the UEFA Europa League.

Format
The tournament features 8 clubs from EHF member countries.

Qualification
Each year one of the 8 available league places is allocated to an EHF member country's national association. The clubs admitted are the clubs of those nations who finished ranked third to sixth in the previous year's Trophy II; the clubs of those two nations from the previous year's Trophy I; plus the clubs of those two nations promoted from the previous year's Challenge I.

Tournament summary

The teams are separated into 2 pools of 4 teams. In each pool (pool A and B) the teams play one match against each of the other three teams in their pool (making a total of six pool matches). The teams then go on to play classification matches based on their relative ranking from these pool matches to determine their final tournament position.

Tournament details

In each pool, A, and B, all the teams play each other once, with points awarded as follows:

 5 points for a win
 2 points for a draw
 1 point for a loss with a goal difference of no more than 2
 0 points for a loss with a goal difference of more than 2

Once the relative ranking of the teams in pools A and B is settled, the classification matches proceed as follows:

 The teams ranked first in each pool will play for 1st and 2nd place (the Final)
 The teams ranked 2nd in each pool will play for 3rd/4th place (bronze medal)
 The teams ranked 3rd in each pool will play for 5th/6th place
 The teams ranked 4th in each pool will play for 7th/8th place

If the score at the end of the regulation time of a classification match is a draw, then a shoot-out competition is played to establish a winner.

Higher and lower tournaments
Above the EuroHockey Club Trophy II is the EuroHockey Club Trophy I, and below it is the EuroHockey Club Challenge 1, the EuroHockey Club Challenge 2, and so on. This structure is designed to give every EHF member nation the opportunity to enter their best clubs into European competition at an appropriate level, and through that exposure to improve the level of their domestic hockey.

Results

1981–1989
From 1981 until 1989, the tournament was held once a year and the finalists' countries were promoted to the EuroHockey Club Champions Cup.

1990–1993
From 1990 until 1993 the tournament was held twice a year and only the winner's countries were promoted to the EuroHockey Club Champions Cup.

1994–2002
Because of the introduction of the EuroHockey Club Challenge, the tournament went back to the old format from 1994 until 2002.

2003–2007
From 2003 until 2007 there was no final but instead, there were two promotion play-offs and the winners were ranked joint first and the winner's countries were promoted. The final ranking was decided based on their record in the pools.

2008–2019
In 2008 the tournament went back to its old format with a final but instead of two promotion places, the clubs scored points for their national association in the EHF 3-year rating, which sets the number of clubs in a nation for the European Cup competitions. Qualifying for the trophy were the runners-up of the countries in positions 9 to 12 and the champions of the countries in positions 13 to 16 in the EHF 3-year rating.

2020–present
In 2020, the EuroHockey Club Trophy was renamed to EuroHockey Club Trophy I.

Records and statistics

Performance by club

Performances by nation

Notes

See also
EuroHockey Club Champions Cup
Euro Hockey League
Women's EuroHockey Club Trophy

References

External links
EuroHockey Club Trophy 2012
EuroHockey Club Competitions Regulations

 
International club field hockey competitions in Europe
Recurring sporting events established in 1981
1981 establishments in Europe